The Albanian Land Force is the land force branch of the Albanian Armed Forces.

Mission 
The Albanian Land Force's main mission is the defense of the independence, sovereignty and territorial integrity of the Republic of Albania, participation in humanitarian, combat, non-combat and peace support operations.

History 

Land Force is a priority unit in the structure of the Armed Forces. Land Force was established on August 29, 2000, and included military units with traditions and rich multi-year activity, spread across the territory of the Republic of Albania. In 2000 the Land Force included five infantry divisions with 55 brigades and 300 battalions deployed in 167 different regions of the country. During its continuous reform, the Land Force underwent new changes. In 2006 it was dissolved and the Joint Force Command was established. In the context of the ongoing transformation of the Armed Forces, based on the concept of an army small in number, operational and professional, on 9 December 2009 the Land Force was re-established on the basis of Rapid Reaction Brigade and Commando Regiment.

Based on the constitutional mission, the Land Force was involved in a process of profound transformation according to Western military concepts, and with the transition of the entire force from a conscript military service into a professional army, its operational level has increased. The structures of Land Force have been engaged in Peace Support Operations in Bosnia-Herzegovina, Iraq, Chad and currently in Herat and Kandahar, Afghanistan. Land Force has the major share in peacekeeping operations in the framework of NATO, UN and EU. The Land Force is managed by young qualified leaders educated in military schools of NATO countries, as in the United States, Italy, Turkey, Germany, United Kingdom, Austria, etc., based on cooperation projects with these countries.

Land Force is engaged in civil emergency operations to help the community in cases of natural disasters, such as floods and blocked roads, and aid in distribution in cases of heavy snowfalls, fire suppression operations, etc.

Since its establishment the Land Force has been led by experienced commanders. From 2000 to 2006 it was headed by Maj. Gen. Kostaq Karoli; from 2006 to 2008 it was led by Brig. Gen. Shpëtim Spahiu; from 2008-August 2012 by Brig. Gen. Viktor Berdo. From August 2012 to November 2013 it has been commanded by Maj. Gen. Zyber Dushku. Since 11 November 2013, Maj. Gen. Jeronim Bazo has been Chief of Staff.

Structure 

Organizational divisions of the land force include:

  Land Force, in Zall-Herr
 Command and Staff, in Zall-Herr
 Staff Support Company, in Zall-Herr
 1st Infantry Battalion, in Vau i Dejës
 2nd Infantry Battalion, in Zall-Herr (assigned to NATO Response Force)
 3rd Infantry Battalion, in Poshnjë
 Commando Battalion (Albania), in Zall-Herr
 Special Operations Battalion, in Zall-Herr
 Combat Support Battalion, in Zall-Herr
 "Zall-Herr" Garrison, in Zall-Herr
 Training Centre, in Zall-Herr

Officer ranks

Other ranks

Specific tasks
Maintaining and developing capacities to provide a high level of readiness.
Continuous and sufficient training to deal with the tasks that might be assigned to it.
Assisting the community in cases of humanitarian emergencies; supporting search and rescue operations.
Cooperating with other national institutions in preventing illegal trafficking, smuggling of people and conventional weapons in Albania.
Training and participating with troops in peace support missions in the framework of NATO, EU and UN.

Equipment

Gallery

See also
Royal Albanian Army
Albanian Air Force
Albanian Navy

References

External links
Ministry of Defence of Albania
Albanian Armed Forces
http://www.aaf.mil.al/english/index.php/land-force Mission of Albanian land forces
http://www.aaf.mil.al/english/index.php/land-force Specific tasks of Albanian land forces
http://www.aaf.mil.al/english/index.php/land-force/126-historiku-i-forces-tokesore History of Albanian land forces
http://www.armyrecognition.com/world-army-equipment-topmenu-993/east-europe-topmenu-85/albania-topmenu-742?task=view&id=2576 Heavy armoured and tanks Albanian Armed Forces
http://www.armyrecognition.com/world-army-equipment-topmenu-993/east-europe-topmenu-85/albania-topmenu-742?task=view&id=2576 Mortar

2000 establishments in Albania
Military units and formations of Albania
Military units and formations established in 2000